Siddeeq Muneer Shabazz (born February 5, 1981) is a former gridiron football safety and linebacker. He was drafted by the Oakland Raiders in the seventh round of the 2003 NFL Draft. He played college football at New Mexico State.

Shabazz has also been a member of the Atlanta Falcons, Cincinnati Bengals, Washington Redskins, New Orleans Saints, Miami Dolphins, Edmonton Eskimos, Winnipeg Blue Bombers, Las Vegas Locomotives and Calgary Stampeders.

Shabazz was born in Germany but moved to Chaparral, New Mexico when he was four or five years old. Shabazz's parents were Muslim but Shabazz himself did not start practicing Islam until college before eventually stopping.

References

1981 births
Living people
American football safeties
Atlanta Falcons players
Canadian football defensive backs
Cincinnati Bengals players
Edmonton Elks players
Miami Dolphins players
New Mexico State Aggies football players
New Orleans Saints players
Oakland Raiders players
Sportspeople from Frankfurt
Rhein Fire players
Washington Redskins players
Winnipeg Blue Bombers players
Las Vegas Locomotives players
Calgary Stampeders players